Coscinida tibialis is a species of comb-footed spider in the family Theridiidae. It is found in Africa, southern Europe, the Middle East, and Central Asia. It was introduced to Thailand.

References

Theridiidae
Spiders described in 1895